An earthquake with a moment magnitude of 7.0 occurred on 30 October 2020 about  northeast of the Greek island of Samos. In Greece, there were two fatalities and 19 injured. The earthquake is the deadliest in the year 2020, and the third major earthquake to strike Turkey that year. The event is called the Samos earthquake by the International Seismological Centre.

Tectonic setting 

The Aegean Sea is a seismically active region with complex plate tectonics interaction both within and surrounding the Aegean Sea Plate. The region has several major plate boundary including the North Anatolian Fault which runs through northern Turkey, where the Anatolian Plate slides past the Eurasian Plate along this right-lateral strike-slip fault. Another major boundary is the East Anatolian Fault where the Arabian Plate interacts with the Anatolian Plate. This transform fault was responsible for the 2020 Elazığ earthquake.

At its southern edge, the African Plate converges north towards the Aegean Sea Plate at a rate of /yr. It subducts beneath the Aegean, occasionally producing great megathrust earthquakes and tsunamis including the 365 Crete earthquake. The subduction rate along the Hellenic subduction zone at /yr, however, greatly exceeds the velocity of the African Plate. North-south extension within the Aegean Sea Plate in the back-arc region compensate the subduction rate. Shallow crustal earthquakes within the Aegean Sea Plate is a result of this extension, accommodated by east-west trending normal faults.

Historical seismicity
The first record of an earthquake in the Samos and İzmir region date back to 200 BC, describing an earthquake of magnitude 6.0–6.5, and intensity VII–VIII. Another earthquake with an estimated magnitude of 7.0 struck the region in 47 AD. On the island of Samos, these earthquakes have minimal effects. On the other hand, nearby Izmir have suffered serious catastrophe as a result of these earthquakes.

The most destructive event in the region was the 1688 Smyrna earthquake, which had an epicentre near İzmir. With an estimated magnitude 7.0, the earthquake killed 15,000–20,000 people in the city.

Other major events took place in 1739 and 1788, causing major damage in the city.

On 11 August 1904, Samos was rocked by a magnitude 6.8 earthquake, causing substantial damage in Greece and Turkey, and killing four people. That earthquake according to researchers, was caused by an onshore fault (Pythagorion Fault) on the island.

Earthquake 
The Hellenic Trench, where the African Plate moves north at a rate of approximately /yr with respect to the Eurasian Plate, is the nearest plate boundary. Due to its geological setting away from a plate boundary, it is considered an intraplate earthquake. A focal mechanism analysis indicated that the earthquake occurred on a moderately dipping normal fault striking either eastward or westward. This mechanism indicates north-south oriented extension that is common in the Aegean Sea. The United States Geological Survey stated that normal faulting events of this size typically have a fault area of  x .

The North Samos Fault, also known as the Kaystrios Fault, is an east–west striking, north–northeast dipping normal fault located offshore, north of the coast of Samos. The fault was previously determined to have the potential to produce an earthquake of magnitude 6.8. The epicentral location suggests it was on the western extension of the geologically active Büyük Menderes Graben. The earthquake released a seismic moment of 3.3 × 1019 N-m, corresponding to a moment magnitude of 7.0.

Strong ground motion

The earthquake achieved a peak ground acceleration (pga) of 0.27 g in Samos. Weaker ground acceleration was recorded at 0.1 g in İzmir, however, in the Bayraklı and Karşıyaka metropolitan districts, these ground motions were amplified with longer periods of 1.5 seconds. Ground motions were severely amplified in these districts due to the soil condition consisting of loose sediments. In the Turkish town of Kuşadası, the pga was 0.18 g. The maximum intensity was recorded on Samos Island, VIII (Severe), a revision from X (Extreme). Shaking was also felt on the Greek island of Crete, and in some regions of Athens.

Foreshocks and aftershocks 
The earthquake was preceded by a foreshock sequence consisting of 39 events over a period of three months.

As of 8 November, over 2,800 aftershocks have been recorded. The mainshock may have been preceded by a foreshock on 5 May the same year.

Tsunami 
Tsunami information was issued by the Kandilli Observatory Earthquake Monitoring and Tsunami Warning Center to the Earthquake Research Department of Turkey approximately 11 minutes after the earthquake, but was not broadcast to the coastal regions. The tsunami arrived between 10 and 15 minutes after the mainshock.

Multiple social media posts showed water rushing through streets and ports in the region following the earthquake, along with tsunami warnings being issued for the islands of Ikaria, Kos, Chios and Samos. Recorded heights of the tsunami from this event were larger that of other similar magnitude earthquakes in the same region with the exception of the 1956 Amorgos earthquake.

Moderate damage to the Turkish and Greek coast were caused by the tsunami, with no structural damage to buildings reported. The tsunami produced unusually long basin oscillations, persisting for over a day after the earthquake. The earthquake itself generated an unusually large tsunami for its magnitude and normal focal mechanism.

Turkish coast
Analysis of video footage on the coast showed that the tsunami had a maximum height of  when it struck.

East of Alaçatı is Zeytineli, where the tsunami severely damaged unoccupied resort houses along a stretch of beach. Debris from damaged structures were strewn along the beach.

A  surge flooded and damaged a diving center near the coast. Garden walls and fences of homes at the shore were also damaged. Cars and boats were among the large objects picked up by the surge and moved inland. The only known tsunami fatality was reported in this town.

The tsunami waves where higher in this region due to the geometry of the coast; the presence of a shallow bay.

Greek coast
On the island of Samos, the tsunami caused major flooding on its northern coast, and was recorded by multiple people on video camera. No deaths were reported by the tsunami. Many offices and businesses were immediately flooded when the surge broke through windows and doors. Waves of  traveled as far as 101 meters inland. Damage to boats and cars were widely reported in the aftermath. A number of small boats and cars were carried inland or lost at sea by the tsunami. Some boats were smashed along breakwater structures as well. Shops, hotel lobbies, restaurants, offices and homes suffered slight damage when the tsunami inundated the ground level and indoors. The tsunami caused some material damage to a home that was located at the coast.

Geological effects
The earthquake produced significant coseismic uplift on the island of Samos. Surface ruptures were also observed on the island. The beaches, ports, and coasts of Samos were partially raised in the aftermath. An aftershock measuring  4.5 on January 20, 2021 generated  of additional uplift in the same area. Similar measurements were taken at a marina in Marathokampos. According to the Earth Applied Sciences Disasters Program of NASA, synthetic-aperture radar data revealed Samos Island was raised by as much as  meanwhile its northern coast subsided by the same amount. The ground uplift and subsidence pattern suggested a coseismic rupture along a fault located north of the island, dipping at an angle towards the north.

Small normal-mechanism surface ruptures were documented near the villages of Kontakaiika, Ayios Nikolaos, and Ayios Elias. The coseismic surface ruptures resulted in some damage to roads and brick walls.

Small landslides, rockfalls and slope failures were reported along fault scarps on Samos. Some instances of rockfalls caused minor traffic disruption when they partially blocked roads. A small rockfall caused slight damage to an adjacent building in Kokkari. Ground cracks appeared on a road at Malagari. The cracked caused part of the road, and small trees to slide several centimeters closer to the shore as a result of lateral spreading. Minor liquefaction occurred at the beach near the town as well.

Impact 

Overall, minor damage occurred on Samos despite its close proximity to the epicentre. On 4 November, the mayor of İzmir, Tunç Soyer, stated that 15,000 people in the city were made homeless. Total damage is estimated to be in the millions for Greece, and over $400 million for Turkey. Serious structural damage and pancake-style building collapses caused many deaths in Izmir.

Greece
Greek authorities from Samos stated that although buildings were damaged across the island, the worst sustained was in Karlovasi, where a large church had partially collapsed. In Karlovasi, over 100 buildings were damaged upon inspection. It was the first time since 2017 that there are earthquake-related fatalities in Greece.

On-site inspections of buildings on the island began hours after the quake, and ended on November 15. Of the 4,245 buildings inspected, 57 percent were declared unsafe for inhabitation. At least 87 percent of damaged buildings were of masonry construction while 6 percent were of reinforced concrete types. Damage mostly consisted of partial collapse or shear cracks. Churches and other religious buildings suffered significant but repairable damaged in the quake. Archeological sites and items of historical value were damaged, some of which beyond repair. At the Archaeological Museum of Pythagorion, vessels and sculptures were destroyed. The parameter wall of the Castle of Lycurgus Logothetis suffered partial collapses. A crack appeared in the marble structure of the Archaeological Museum of Vathy.

Turkey

Initially, Turkish Minister of the Interior Süleyman Soylu stated that at least six buildings were destroyed in İzmir, but the city's mayor Tunç Soyer later put the number of collapsed buildings closer to 20. On-site investigations by the Turkish Ministry of Environment and Urbanization revised the number of collapsed and intentionally demolished buildings to 103. At least 700 other buildings suffered serious damage, and in 814, damage was moderate. Slight structural damage was reported in across 7,889 buildings, while the other 159,000 were unaffected.

Collapse apartments accounted for nearly all 117 deaths in Turkey. Among the deadliest collapse involved the Rıza Bey Apartment, where 38 people including 11 children died.

Most of the buildings that collapsed were built in the 1990s, based on outdated earthquake regulations from 1975. Poor construction practices and the absence of code compliance were reasons for the collapse. The buildings that totally failed were typically between 5–10 storeys tall, and at least 30 years old. Additionally, the first floors of these buildings were altered for commercial use such as shops. The city is also built on soft sediments in a basin which amplified the intensity of shaking despite its distance from the epicentre. 

It is believed that the effects of basin amplification worsened the intensity of ground motions, causing structural failures. The observation of damage effects and instrumental data found that ground motions were amplified 2.5–3 times in the İzmir basin.

Casualties

One hundred and seventeen (117) people were killed and 1,034 were injured in Turkey, all but one in the city of Izmir. The other Turkish victim outside Izmir died from drowning in the advancing tsunami in the district of Seferihisar. It was the first recorded tsunami fatality in Turkey. Additionally, two teenagers died in Greece after being crushed by a wall on the island of Samos; 19 others were injured in Greece.

Relief operations 

Immediately after the earthquake, Turkish Minister of Health Fahrettin Koca stated that about 40 ambulances, 35 emergency rescue teams and two ambulance helicopters had reached the affected region, while Turkey's Ministry of National Defence stated that one of its planes had departed from Etimesgut Air Base to transport AFAD and gendarmerie teams to the scene. The Turkish Red Crescent immediately deployed teams from six cities to provide food to those affected by the earthquake. More than 1,200 workers were involved in rescue efforts involving at least 13 buildings in İzmir, which continued into the night. According to Al Jazeera, the personnel involved in the rescue operations had reached about 8,000, including 25 search and rescue dogs. Turkish authorities stated that 106 people were rescued, while the local government had set up tents to house about 2,000 people overnight. On 3 November, a three-year-old girl was rescued from an eight-story building—a toddler was rescued after being trapped in another building for 65 hours a day before. A total of 17 collapsed buildings were part of the search and rescue operations, according Mehmet Gulluoglu, head of Turkey's Disaster and Emergency Management Presidency (AFAD).

Criminal investigation

Following the deadly 1999 İzmit earthquake which claimed 17,000 lives, Turkey has stepped-up its measures on building codes in respond to earthquakes. Codes have enabled increase the safety of newer buildings during seismic events An earthquake tax was established that same year to make infrastructures more resistant to earthquakes.

Among the residential apartments which suffered structural damage was the Yılmaz Erbek Apartment located in the Bayraklı metropolitan district. The 10-storey apartment partially collapsed, destroying the first few floors, killing 11 residents and injuring another 11. An investigation by the İzmir Chief Public Prosecutor's Office found that poor construction materials and practices, and the lack of inspections led to its collapse. During renovation works in the 2000s, the ground floor was renovated for a supermarket. Seven of the nine workspaces in the first floor were combined, which meant columns were deliberately cut to make space for the supermarket. An exterior wall of the structure was also torn down for a window. A total of five indictments were filed against 29 individuals; 10 of whom have been imprisoned. Several public officials were also accused of neglect of duty in the role of the collapse.

Another four individuals were involved in a lawsuit for their roles in the collapse of the Doğanlar Apartment that killed 15 and injured 12. Two of the accused were detained by authorities for "causing the death and injury of more than one person by conscious negligence", and could face jail time of up to 20 years. Officials also arrested individuals involved in the construction of the Rıza Bey Apartment.

International reactions 

Countries:

 
The US embassy has shared their condolences for the dead and wounded in the earthquake.
The NASA analysed satellite imagery and worked with the Turkish Space Agency and several universities in the affected region.
  – The German embassy in Ankara has shared the following message from Twitter "After the earthquake in Izmir, our thoughts are with the victims and their relatives. Get well soon, Izmir!".
  – The Albanian ambassador Kastriot Robo said "Where are with our friends in this hard time".
  – The Australian ambassador to Turkey Marc Innes-Brown shared his condolences and said the following "After the earthquake in Izmir, our thoughts are with the victims and their relatives. Get well soon, Izmir!".
  – General Chairperson of the Indonesian Red Cross and Former Vice President of Indonesia Jusuf Kalla shared his condolences and he said he was ready to send Indonesian Red Cross volunteers to Turkey to help evacuate earthquake victims if needed.

 
 The Azerbaijani President İlham Aliyev called the Turkish President Recep Tayyip Erdoğan. He said that he was sorry and they were prepared to offer aid.
 The President of the National Parliament of Azerbaijan Sahibe Gafarova shared his condolences with his counterpart Mustafa Sentop.
  – The ambassador of UK Dominick Chilcott shared his condolences and said the following "The United Kingdom as always, will be in the side with Turkey".
  – The Danish ambassador Danny Annan, shared his condolences and said the following "I wish my condolences to the relatives of those who lost their lives and a speedy recovery for their benefits.".
  – French Minister of İnternal Affairs Gérald Darmanin, has said that France was ready to offer support to Greece and Turkey.
  – Israeli Minister of Defense Benny Gantz said that they were ready to assist Turkey by sending a search and rescue team and a field hospital.
 
Embassy of Qatar said the following "Due to the Earthquake that happened in Izmir we share our condolences with the Turkish Government and to our Turkish brothers".
A Disaster Information Management Centre was set up in Izmir by the Qatar Red Crescent Society.
 
 The President of the Kazak Parliament Nurlan Nigmatulin, "Stating that we stand by the brotherly Turkish people and share their grief in this tragic moment, I express my urgent healing wishes to the wounded. I wish you patience and fortitude of the people of Turkey.".
 Kazakh Minister of Foreign Affairs Mukhtar Tleuberdi, sent the following message to his counterpart Mevlüt Çavuşoğlu, "I offer my deepest condolences to the bereaved families who lost their relatives by sharing irreplaceable grief. May Allah treat the deceased with His mercy. I wish urgent healing to the injured. We always pray for the well-being of the brotherly Turkish people.".
  – Kosovo President Hashim Thaçi, shared his condolences and said the following from social media, "Our prayers are with the relatives of those who lost their lives and the injured, Kosovo stands by the Turkish people and state in this difficult time.".
  – The President of TRNC Ersin Tatar has called the Turkish President Recep Tayyip Erdoğan and shared his condolences.
  – The Hungarian ambassador Viktor Matis shared his condolences.
  – The Pakistani Ministry of Foreign Affairs said the following, "We are always with our Turkish brothers and our prayers are with you".
 
 Russian President Vladimir Putin shared his condolences with the Turkish President Recep Tayyip Erdoğan.
 The Russian embassy said the following "Izmir Seferihisar earthquake in Turkey thus extend our best wishes and we hope there will be no loss of life.".
  – The Uzbekistani President Şevket Mirziyoyev shared his condolences.
  – The Ukrainian President Volodymyr Zelensky expressed his condolences on Twitter.
  – The Greek Minister of Foreign Affairs Nikos Dendias has called his counterpart Mevlüt Çavuşoğlu and shared his condolences.
  – The Japanese Prime Minister Suga Yoshihide shared his condolences and said the following, "We are deeply saddened by the news that many people have died and there is serious damage, Like Turkey, Japan has experienced serious damage from earthquakes many times, and Japan and Turkey have supported each other during past earthquakes. Japan will always be with the people of Turkey in overcoming these hardships.".
  – The Minister for Foreign Affairs Vivian Balakrishnan offered his condolences to both countries, adding that the country is ready to offer assistance.

International organisations:

 
 EU Council President Charles Michel: "Developments related Strong earthquake off the coast of the Aegean Sea in Greece and Turkey are closely monitored.".
 The EU Turkey Delegation President and Ambassador Nikolaus Meyer-Landrut heard deep sorrow for the earthquake victims "The EU expresses its deepest condolences to the families of the earthquake victims, would wish healing for a moment before the injured.".
  – NATO General Secretary Jens Stoltenberg said they were ready to offer assistance.
  – Turkic Council General Secretary Bağdad Andreyev shared his condolences.

Memorial
On the first year anniversary of the event in 2021, the Çiğli municipality opened a public earthquake memorial to commemorate the event. A memorial service was held at the Hacılarkır Cemetery in the Karşıyaka where most of the victims were laid to rest. Monuments were also erected near the Rıza Bey Apartment which collapsed.

Gallery

See also 

2020s in environmental history
List of earthquakes in 2020
List of earthquakes in Greece
List of earthquakes in Turkey

Notes

References

Further reading

External links

USGS: Magnitude 7 Earthquake Off the Coast of Greece and Turkey
M7.0 Earthquake & Tsunami Hits Turkey & Greece – Oct. 30, 2020
Tsunami propagation from Magnitude 7.0 in the Aegean Sea
ITSAK ShakeMap: Northern coast of W. Turkey

2020 earthquakes
2020 disasters in Greece
2020 disasters in Turkey
2020 tsunamis
2020s in İzmir
Earthquakes in Greece
Earthquakes in Turkey
History of the Aegean Sea
History of İzmir Province
History of Samos
October 2020 events in Europe 
October 2020 events in Greece 
October 2020 events in Turkey 
Tsunamis in Greece
Aegean Sea